This is a list of street foods. Street food is ready-to-eat food or drink typically sold by a vendor on a street and in other public places, such as at a market or fair. It is often sold from a portable food booth, food cart, or food truck and meant for immediate consumption. Some street foods are regional, but many have spread beyond their region of origin. Street food vending is found all around the world, but varies greatly between regions and cultures.

Most street foods are classed as both finger food and fast food, and are cheaper on average than restaurant meals. According to a 2007 study from the Food and Agriculture Organization, 2.5 billion people eat street food every day.

Street foods

Unsorted

 Chongqing noodles
 Donkey Burger
 Ewa Aganyin
 Jianbing guozi
 Pizza by the slice
 Roujiamo
 Smažený sýr
 Tapioca chips

See also

 Food street
 Hong Kong street food
 Hot dog variations
 List of kebabs
 Mexican street food
 Regional street food
 Street food
 Street food in South Korea
 Street food of Chennai
 Street food of Indonesia
 Street food of Mumbai
 Street food of Thailand
 Street market

Notes

References

External links
 
 
 "The Best Street Food Around the World". Rough Guides.
 "The Best Moroccan Food While Trekking in Morocco".

'
street